The slender-billed crow (Corvus enca) is a Passerine bird of the family Corvidae, in the genus Corvus. The violet crow has been found to be distinct genetically and separated as Corvus violaceus. The small crow has been split as Corvus samarensis and the Palawan crow has also been split as Corvus pusillus.

Distribution and habitat
It is found throughout Maritime Southeast Asia (Brunei, Indonesia and the Philippines) and Peninsular Malaysia. Its natural habitats are subtropical or tropical moist lowland forest and subtropical or tropical mangrove forest.

References

slender-billed crow
Birds of Malesia
slender-billed crow
Taxonomy articles created by Polbot